Under the Pendulum Sun is a 2017 fantasy novel by British writer Jeannette Ng. Ng's debut novel, it was published by Angry Robot.

Synopsis

In the mid 19th century, Catherine Helstone travels to Arcadia in search of her brother Laon, a missionary who disappeared while trying to convert the fae to Christianity.

Reception

Under the Pendulum Sun was a finalist for the 2018 British Fantasy Award for Best Fantasy Novel, and earned Ng the 2018 Best Newcomer award. Ng also won the John W. Campbell Award for Best New Writer at the 2019 Hugo Awards.

In the Guardian, Adam Roberts called it "strange, brooding and occasionally perverse" and "opulently atmospheric." SYFY declared it to be one of the 10 best novels of 2017, stating that its "world-building and atmosphere are just incredible" and emphasizing its Gothic tone.

Publishers Weekly considered it "intriguing but unfocused," with "possibilities (that) are fascinating" and "period touches (that) satisfy," but an "unwieldy" plot. James Nicoll called it "engaging," with Arcadia being an "odd and melancholy world," and lauded Ng's choice to reveal only the "shadow of (her) worldbuilding, (such that readers) are left to puzzle out the larger implications on their own."  Jeff Somers, listing it among his "50 of the Greatest Science Fiction & Fantasy Debut Novels Ever Written," called it "a truly original fantasy debut built on a truly genius premise."

In 2020, Samantha Shannon picked the book as her submission for the "I wish more people would read..." feature in The Guardian, describing its premise as a "stroke of pure brilliance" and the book as having "the mark of a true Gothic masterpiece."

References

External links
The Science of the Pendulum Sun, essay by Ng explaining the physics of the setting

2017 British novels
2017 debut novels
British Gothic novels
Angry Robot books